The Optus Centre is located at 367 Collins Street, Melbourne. Standing 153 metres tall, it incorporates 34 floors, and was completed in 1975. The main foyer, and mezzanine areas are home to cafes and formerly, a branch of the Commonwealth Bank. Major tenants include Optus, Sportsbet, the Australian Institute of Company Directors, Insync and a donor centre for Australian Red Cross Lifeblood.

Originally an office building for the Commonwealth Bank, the tower was the tallest building in Melbourne when completed, eclipsing the former BHP House by 1 metre. It was overtaken two years later with the completion of the 52-storey Nauru House.

The building is also home to a breeding pair of peregrine falcons. During the breeding season, a display is set up in the foyer, to enable the public to view the nest as the young hatch.

See also
 List of tallest buildings in Melbourne

References

External links
 Emporis Buildings - Optus Centre, Melbourne
 SkyscraperPage.com - Optus Centre
 Walking Melbourne - Optus House

Optus
Skyscrapers in Melbourne
Office buildings in Melbourne
Skyscraper office buildings in Australia
Office buildings completed in 1975
Collins Street, Melbourne
Buildings and structures in Melbourne City Centre
1975 establishments in Australia